St. John's Hospital Camarillo is a hospital in Camarillo, California, United States, operated by Dignity Health, along with its sister hospital St. John's Regional Medical Center in Oxnard, California.

The hospital was founded in 1974 by a group of community leaders and physicians. In addition to its 81 acute-care beds, St. John's Hospital Camarillo has a 99-bed extended care unit and the only hyperbaric medicine unit in western Ventura County.

Darren Lee serves as president and CEO of both St. John's Hospital Camarillo and St. John's Regional Medical Center.

History
The hospital opened in July 1974 and was originally named Pleasant Valley Hospital. Located on a  site nestled near the foothills of Camarillo, the hospital was built with five acres that were donated originally by the Berylwood Investment Company. James P. Lockett designed the facility using a hexagon shape first seen in early Roman architecture.

In 1976, Pleasant Valley Hospital received accreditation from the Joint Commission of Accreditation of Hospitals (JCAHO). That same year, the hospital reached full occupancy of its 46 beds for the first time since opening.

In 1986, ground breaking began for the new 99-bed skilled nursing facility. The first floor's 49 beds were used for rehabilitation of stroke victims, heart attack victims, and patients on respirators. The second floor's 50 beds were used for long-term care patients.

In 1993, Pleasant Valley Hospital in Camarillo became known as St. John's Pleasant Valley Hospital, after it merged with St. John's Regional Medical Center in Oxnard.

In 1997, St. John's hospitals joined Catholic Healthcare West (CHW) as part of the CHW Central Coast system of hospitals. After the merger of the two hospitals, St. John's Pleasant Valley Hospital underwent significant growth. The hospital added technology including wound treatment, hyperbaric medicine oxygen chambers, and diagnostic imaging equipment.

References

External links 

This hospital in the California Healthcare Atlas, a project by OSHPD

Hospital buildings completed in 1974
Hospitals in Ventura County, California
Dignity Health
Christian hospitals
Buildings and structures in Camarillo, California